National Institute of Technology Patna (NIT Patna), formerly Bihar School of Engineering and Bihar College of Engineering, is a public engineering institution located in Patna in the Indian state of Bihar. It was renamed as NIT Patna, by the Government of India on 28 January 2004. NIT Patna marked its humble beginning in 1886 with the establishment of pleaders survey training school which was subsequently promoted to Bihar College of Engineering Patna in 1924. This made this institute the 6th Oldest Engineering Institute of India. It is an autonomous institute functioning directly under Ministry of Education, Government of India.

History

NIT Patna origin can be traced to 1886 with the establishment of a survey training school and subsequent renaming it to Bihar college of Engineering in 1900. A graduate level curriculum was introduced in 1924. It was renamed Bihar College of Engineering in 1932. In 2004 the government of India upgraded the college to National Institute of Technology (NIT) status, as the state of Bihar had lost its only Regional Engineering College (REC), located at Jamshedpur, when Jharkhand was carved out of Bihar in 2000. By 2002, the Indian government decided to upgrade all RECs to NITs, with the aim of having at least one NIT per state. Bihar College of Engineering was the first institute to be directly upgraded to NIT status. In 2007, it was granted Institute of National Importance status in accordance with the National Institutes of Technology Act, 2007.

Campus

NIT Patna functions from a  campus along Ashok Rajpath, geographically which lies on the southern bank of the river Ganges exactly opposite the point of its confluence with river Gandak. The campus lies alongside Gandhi Ghat where students usually enjoy scenic views of river Ganges. Land for a new campus, a  plot, has been assigned at Sikandarpur village in Bihta, around 40 km from Patna. Earlier it was assigned at Dumri village in Bihta. Once NIT-Patna shifts to its new campus in Bihta, it will run some management courses on the present campus at Ashok Rajpath.

Facilities 

 Central Library
 Computer Center
 Student Activity center (SAC)
GYM (separate for boys and girls.)
College Canteens(Govt Canteen, Nescafe Canteen)
 TT and Badminton court with Synthetic International flooring
 Squash Courts
 Medical Center
 Cricket / Football Ground with stands for 1000+ students

Academics

Departments

The institute includes the department of Architecture & Planning, Engineering departments of civil engineering, computer science & engineering, electrical engineering, electronics & communication engineering and mechanical engineering. In addition there is an architecture department and departments for physics, chemistry, mathematics and social sciences and humanities.

Library
The institute maintains a central library which has 150,000 books and 1,100 e-journals and works for only about 10 hours per day.
The Central Library has an e-resource section on the Ground floor, a study section and Library office on the First floor and a separate study room . Library is fully air conditioned  and well cleaned . Security is also available on the each floor for 24  hours.

Computer center
The institute has a computer center with six computer labs and a two virtual classrooms equipped with computing and audio-visual facilities such as interactive boards, and projectors. The labs have CCTV cameras for conducting online interviews, tests and presentations. CC has Internet connectivity throughout the day so students can use internet facility. A central bandwidth of 1GBps provided by RailTel for uninterrupted high-speed Internet connection.

Ranking 

NIT Patna was ranked 63rd among engineering colleges in India by the National Institutional Ranking Framework (NIRF) in 2022.

Student life

Extracurricular activities 
From institute website to the annual cultural fest, the institute delegates responsibility to its students wherever possible. With activities and competitions taking place every other day, students are provided with opportunities to develop their soft skills and therefore broaden their perspective. A few notable events are listed below.

Festivals

Until 2015 the college had two separate festivals, the cultural fest Melange and the technical fest Corona. From 2015 onwards the college celebrates Corona and Melange together, occurring every year in January. The event is entirely managed by students. Students from colleges all over the country participate including students from IIT Patna, BIT Patna, Kalinga Institute of Industrial Technology, Rajasthan College of Engineering for Women, Arya Institute of Engineering and Technology, Bengal College of Engineering and Technology, NIT Tripura and NIT Mizoram. Some events also invite students from local schools such St. Michael's High School, Patna, Loyola High School, Patna and Don Bosco Academy.

Cultural fest activities include events such as face painting, singing, dancing, antakshari and rangoli competitions as well as art and craft exhibitions and sports. Technical events include robotics, circuit designing, programming, and presentation competitions and workshops. The festival includes lectures by renown people such as Kumar Vishwas, Irshad Kamil and Srijan Pal Singh. The event also includes performances from bands such as Underground Authority in Corona 2014 and Raeth in Corona 2015.

The students of NIT Patna also celebrate Parakram, the annual intramural sport festival.

Indoor and outdoor sports
Every year in January, NIT Patna holds a week with events such as cricket, football, table tennis, badminton, carom, and discus throw. Managed by students, this event tests their organising and managerial skills. NIT Patna cricket team were runners up in 2018 inter NIT Trophy.
The NIT Patna Strength Games team, which includes weightlifting, powerlifting and bodybuilding has won the overall champions' trophy consecutively in  2018 as well as 2019, while bagging the 'best lifter' trophy in both the years (Kumar Aman, mtech '18 and Rajendra Meena, btech '19)

Societies

The institute recognizes these major societies:
The Cultural Society organizes a cultural extravaganza under the name Mélange – the melting pot of talents.
The Common Room Society organizes indoor games competitions like chess, carom, table tennis, badminton, and Su-doku championship.
The Outdoor Society conducts field events like cricket, football, volleyball, javelin, discus and includes the Athletic Society, which conducts the athletic events.
The EXE-Extreme Engineering society provides lectures on robotics and embedded systems which is no more functional because of lack of administrative support.
NIT-Patna started up student chapters with an internationally recognized societies like ASME (American Society of Mechanical Engineers) for ME students and IEEE (Institute of Electrical and Electronics Engineers) for ECE and EE students.
SANKALP Ghar Ghar Shiksha Ka- An organization established by the students of NIT Patna in 2007, to teach unprivileged kids from nearby slums. The organization comes under NSS.
INCUBATION CENTER- Government of Bihar unveiled the Bihar & Start Policy 2017 to foster entrepreneurship and selected NIT Patna as one of the pilot institutes.
Incubation Center is officially in the list of incubators under the Bihar & Start Policy 2017.

Residential student halls 
The housing facilities (hostels) are:

Boys hostels:

 Sone Hostel Block A (earlier known as New Engineer's Hostel)
 Sone Hostel Block B (earlier known as Engineer's Hostel-1)
 Kosi Hostel (new)
 Bagmati Hostel (earlier known as Engineers' Hostel-2)
 Brahmaputra Hostel (new)

Girls hostels:

 Ganga Hostel (Blocks A, B and C earlier knows as Girl Engineer's Hostel – GEH )
These hostels now can accommodate all of the students because of the newly constructed Brahmaputra hostel making it a fully residential campus.

Notable alumni 

Bindeshwari Dubey, Former Chief Minister of Bihar
Nitish Kumar, Chief Minister of Bihar
Ratan Kumar Sinha, Chairman of Atomic Energy Commission of India (AEC); Secretary, Department of Atomic Energy (DAE)
PA Sangma, Former Chief minister of Meghalaya
Bhubaneswar Behera, An Engineer, Writer and a Scholar from Odisha
Manas Bihari Verma, Indian Aeronautical Scientist

See also

 Patna University
 National Institute of Technology, Durgapur
 National Institute of Technology, Rourkela
 National Institute of Technology, Hamirpur
National Institute of technology, Jamshedpur

References

External links

Universities and colleges in Patna
Education in Patna
Engineering colleges in Bihar
National Institutes of Technology
1886 establishments in India
All India Council for Technical Education